The Aija Province is one of 20 provinces of the Ancash Region in Peru.

Geography 
The Cordillera Negra traverses the province. Some of the highest mountains of the province are listed below:

Political division
Aija is divided into five districts, which are:

Ethnic groups 
The province is inhabited by indigenous citizens of Quechua descent. Spanish is the language which the majority of the population (62.10%) learnt to speak in childhood, while 37.70% of the residents started speaking using the Quechua language (2007 Peru Census).

Sources 

Provinces of the Ancash Region